Alum Creek is  long creek that runs north to south in central Ohio. The creek originates in Morrow County and then flows through Delaware County and finally into Franklin County, where it ends at Big Walnut Creek, which drains into the Scioto River. Alum Creek is a source of drinking water for the city of Westerville, Ohio.

History
The Alum Creek valley was inhabited by the Adena over 2,000 years ago. This mound builder culture constructed seven mounds along Alum Creek. The Lenape (Delaware) Indian tribe later established many settlements near the creek.

One of the first European settlers was Colonel Moses Byxbe, who constructed his home on Alum Creek in 1805. Colonel Byxbe owned or co-owned  along the creek.

As a defensive measure during the War of 1812, local residents built four blockhouses in the area, including one on Alum Creek. The blockhouse, Fort Cheshire, was a 2-story log fortress, constructed so as to provide a place from which to shoot, drop boiling water, and defend against the threat of fire. The blockhouse was subsequently used as a schoolhouse and remained intact until the Civil War. The fort is commemorated by a bronze plaque where the blockhouse once stood.

Underground Railroad
The history of Alum Creek is also notable for its connection to the Underground Railroad, by which many slaves found their freedom. The Underground Railroad's Sycamore Trail ran along Alum Creek.  Africa Road, near Alum Creek, is so named because of the nearby settlement of thirty freed slaves from North Carolina. In 2003 a plaque was erected in associated with The Ohio Historical Society to commemorate its significance.

Course
Alum Creek rises near Mt. Gilead, Ohio and runs south, where it joins with Bunker Run, Indigo Creek, and West Branch Alum Creek. It then flows into Alum Creek Lake, along with Big Run. It flows out of the reservoir through Alum Creek Dam, and joins with several tributaries. It flows through Westerville, Ohio and Columbus, Ohio, before joining with Big Walnut Creek with Blacklick Creek in Three Creeks Metro Park.

Also known as

Allum Creek
Elk Creek
Seckle Creek
Sepung Creek
Salt Creek

Watershed

Alum Creek Lake
Near  Elevation: 

In 1974, the Army Corps of Engineers completed the Alum Creek Reservoir near the middle portion of the creek length.

Alum Creek Lake Dam

Near  Elevation: 

Alum Creek Dam is part of the flood control plan for the Ohio River basin. Construction of the dam was authorized by the United States Congress as part of the Flood Control Act of 1962. Dam construction began in 1970 and was completed in 1974 by the United States Army Corps of Engineers.

The Dam is located in Delaware County and its construction created Alum Creek Lake.

Tributaries
West Branch Alum Creek
Indigo Creek
Bunker Run

See also
List of rivers of Ohio

References

USGS Southeast Columbus, United States Geological Survey. Southeast Columbus quadrangle, Ohio. 1:24,000. 7.5 Minute Series. Washington D.C.: United States Geological Survey, 1992.

External links

Rivers of Ohio
Landforms of Columbus, Ohio
Underground Railroad locations
Rivers of Delaware County, Ohio
Rivers of Franklin County, Ohio
Rivers of Morrow County, Ohio